Eleazer Wakeley (June 25, 1822 – November 21, 1912) was an American pioneer lawyer, politician, and judge in Wisconsin and Nebraska.  He was a Nebraska District Court Judge, a justice of the Nebraska Territory's Supreme Court, and a delegate to Nebraska's constitutional convention.  In Wisconsin, he served two terms in the Wisconsin State Senate and one in the Wisconsin State Assembly, he also served in the last sessions of the legislature of the Wisconsin Territory.

Early years

Born in Homer, New York, Wakeley and his family moved first to Pennsylvania and then to Elyria, Ohio, where he studied the law and was admitted to the Ohio bar. His father was Solmous Wakeley, who served in the Wisconsin Legislature. Wakeley moved to Wisconsin Territory to Whitewater, in Walworth County, where he served in the Wisconsin Territorial Legislature.

Career 
In 1857, Wakeley was appointed to the Nebraska Territorial Supreme Court serving until 1861. He served briefly in the American Civil War, volunteering with the 145th Pennsylvania Infantry Regiment, but received a medical discharge after the Battle of Fredericksburg, only four months into his service. He returned to Wisconsin to practice law and, in 1863, ran for Wisconsin Attorney General, but lost.

Wakeley served in the Wisconsin State Senate 1851–1855 and the Wisconsin State Assembly 1866–1867.

In 1867, Wakeley and his family moved to Omaha, Nebraska. There he practiced law and served in the 1877 Nebraska Constitutional Convention. Wakeley was appointed Nebraska district court judge and was the first president of the Nebraska State Bar Association.

Death 
After he died in Omaha on November 21, 1912, he was buried at the Prospect Hill Cemetery.

Notes

External links

People from Homer, New York
People from Whitewater, Wisconsin
Politicians from Omaha, Nebraska
Members of the Wisconsin Territorial Legislature
19th-century American politicians
Wisconsin state senators
Members of the Wisconsin State Assembly
Nebraska state court judges
1822 births
1912 deaths
Burials at Prospect Hill Cemetery (North Omaha, Nebraska)
Lawyers from Omaha, Nebraska
19th-century American judges
19th-century American lawyers